Acacia tropica is a shrub or small tree native to tropical areas northern Australia.

Description
It has smooth red-brown to grey-brown coloured bark that becomes fibrous with age. It blooms between June and August producing flower-spikes with a length of  that are densely packed with bright yellow flowers.

Taxonomy
The species was first formally described as Acacia cunninghamii var. tropica by Joseph Maiden and William Blakely in 1927. It was described under the current name by the botanist Mary Tindale in 1972 as part of the work Notes on Australian taxa of Acacia as published in Contributions from the New South Wales National Herbarium. It was reclassified as Racosperma tropicum in 1987 by Leslie Pedley then transferred back to genus Acacia in 2001.

Distribution
It is found in the Gulf country of north western Queensland as far east as Croydon extending to the west into the top end of the Northern Territory to around Darwin. It is commonly found alongside creeks and rivers and at base of sandstone hills growing in deep sandy soils in scrubland communities often is association with Melaleuca viridiflora.

See also
 List of Acacia species

References

tropica
Flora of the Northern Territory
Flora of Queensland
Plants described in 1972
Taxa named by Joseph Maiden
Taxa named by William Blakely